The term Finance Secretary might refer to:

 Finance Secretary, the member of the Indian Administrative Service that heads the Finance Ministry
 Finance Secretary (Pakistan)
 Cabinet Secretary for Finance and Sustainable Growth in the devolved government of Scotland